The Red Pill Blues Tour was the eleventh headlining concert tour by American band Maroon 5, in support of their sixth studio album Red Pill Blues (2017). The tour began on May 30, 2018 in Tacoma, Washington and concluded on December 31, 2019 in Las Vegas, Nevada. With over sixty dates, the tour traveled to the Americas, Australia, Asia, and Europe.

Background
Maroon 5 announced the tour on October 26, 2017 and produced by Live Nation Entertainment, with American singer Julia Michaels, who served as the opening act in North America. On August 28, 2018, the band announced new dates for Australia, Asia and Europe. Artists, Cxloe (Australia) and Sigrid (Europe), were announced as the tour's opening acts.

Opening acts

2018
 Julia Michaels (North America)
 PJ Morton (North America)
 Robert DeLong (North America)
 Lee Brice (North America)

2019
 DJ Noah Passovoy (Australia / Asia / Europe)
 Cxloe (Australia)
 Sigrid (Europe)
 Brynn Cartelli (North America)
 Chevel Shepherd (North America)
 Phantom Planet (North America)

Setlist
{{Hidden
| headercss = background: #CECEF2;
| contentcss = text-align: left;
| header = Standard setlist
| content = This setlist is based on the show in Tacoma, Washington on May 30, 2018. It is not intended to represent all dates throughout the tour.

 "What Lovers Do" 
 "Payphone" 
 "This Love"
 "Stereo Hearts"
 "Sunday Morning"
 "Animals"
 "One More Night"
 "Cold"
 "Wait"
 "Don't Wanna Know"
 "It Was Always You"
 "Love Somebody"
 "Makes Me Wonder"
 "Rock with You"
 "Moves Like Jagger"

Encore
 "Lost Stars" 
 "She Will Be Loved"
 "Forever Young" / "Girls Like You"
 "Maps"
 "Sugar"

}}
{{Hidden
| headercss = background: #CECEF2;
| contentcss = text-align: left;
| header = Asia setlist
| content = This setlist is based on the concert in Taiwan on March 1, 2019. It is not intended to represent all dates throughout the Asian leg.

 "What Lovers Do"
 "Payphone" 
 "This Love"
 "Misery"
 "Sunday Morning"
 "Animals"
 "One More Night"
 "Cold"
 "Maps"
 "Harder to Breathe"
 "Don't Wanna Know"
 "Wait"
 "Makes Me Wonder"
 "Rock with You"
 "Moves Like Jagger"

Encore
 "Forever Young" / "Girls Like You"
 "Lost Stars"
 "She Will Be Loved"
 "Sugar"
}}

Shows

Cancelled shows

References

Notes

Citations

2018 concert tours
2019 concert tours
Maroon 5 concert tours
Concert tours of North America
Concert tours of South America
Concert tours of the United States
Concert tours of Asia
Concert tours of Canada
Concert tours of Europe